Dioro may refer to 
Dioro, Mali
Dioro, Burkina Faso